The Texarkana Arkansas School District (TASD) is a U.S. school district founded in 1911 serving Texarkana, Arkansas. It is district No. 7, and is part of Miller County, Arkansas. TASD7 established itself as a magnet school system in 2005 at the elementary and middle school levels and later expanded its magnet school program to include North Heights Jr. High and Arkansas High School in 2006.

Schools

High schools 
 Arkansas High School (9-12) 
 Magnet Academies: Arts, Career and Technology, International Studies, and Sciences

Middle schools 
 Arkansas Middle School (6-8)

Elementary schools 
 Edward R. Trice Elementary School (KG–5)
 Fairview Elementary School (KG–5), one of the first schools in the district, built in 1919 and operating since 1920. Rebuilt in 1992.
 Harmony Leadership Academy. (KG-5)
 Vera Kilpatrick Elementary School (PK–5)

Defunct schools 

 Fairview Ward School, built in 1919. Burned down in the late 1980s.
 North Heights High School, built in 1939. Torn down in 2002.
 North Heights Elementary School, building date unknown. Fate unknown.
 Arkansas Senior High, built around the 1950s. Turned into 9th grade academy.
 Union Elementary School 

In 2007, College Hill Elementary International Studies received top honors by the U.S. Department of Education (ED) in being named a National Blue Ribbon School.
College Hill Elementary is now a Pre-k Center.

References

External links

 
 Arkansas Department of Education | Education Directory | 2006-2007 
 Arkansas.gov | Education | Arkansas School Search - Results for Miller County, Arkansas 

School districts in Arkansas
Education in Miller County, Arkansas
Texarkana, Arkansas
1911 establishments in Arkansas
School districts established in 1911